Sørum is a Norwegian surname that may refer to
Christin Sørum (born 1968), Norwegian long-distance runner 
Halvor Sørum (1897–1965), Norwegian trade unionist and politician
Joachim Sørum (born 1979), Norwegian football player 
Kiki Sørum (1939–2009), Norwegian fashion journalist, editor, and author
Knut Anders Sørum (born 1976), Norwegian singer
Kristian Sørum, Norwegian curler
Morten Sørum, Norwegian curler
Wenche Sørum (born 1951), Norwegian middle-distance runner
Thomas Sørum (born 1982), Norwegian football player

Norwegian-language surnames